The 1969–70 AHL season was the 34th season of the American Hockey League. Nine teams played 72 games each in the schedule.  The Montreal Voyageurs became the second Canada-based team in the league, and finished first overall in the regular season. This would be the last season for the Buffalo Bisons in the AHL as the National Hockey League added the Buffalo Sabres who would begin play the next season, the Bisons would go out on top by winning fifth Calder Cup championship.

Team changes
 The Montreal Voyageurs join the AHL as an expansion team, based in Montreal, Quebec, playing in the East Division.
 The Quebec Aces switch divisions from West to East.
 The Baltimore Clippers and the Hershey Bears switch divisions from East to West.

Final standings
Note: GP = Games played; W = Wins; L = Losses; T = Ties; GF = Goals for; GA = Goals against; Pts = Points;

Scoring leaders

Note: GP = Games played; G = Goals; A = Assists; Pts = Points; PIM = Penalty minutes

 complete list

Calder Cup playoffs
First round
Montreal Voyageurs defeated Baltimore Clippers 4 games to 1.
Buffalo Bisons defeated Quebec Aces 4 games to 2.
Springfield Kings defeated Hershey Bears 4 games to 3.
Second round
In double round-robin, Buffalo Bisons and Springfield Kings advanced. Montreal Voyageurs eliminated after third loss.
Finals
Buffalo Bisons defeated Springfield Kings 4 games to 0, to win the Calder Cup. 
 list of scores

Trophy and award winners
Team awards

Individual awards

Other awards

See also
List of AHL seasons

References
AHL official site
AHL Hall of Fame
HockeyDB

American Hockey League seasons
2
2